Rhodopechys is a genus of finches containing the following two species:

The desert finch, Carduelis obsoleta (formerly Rhodopechys obsoleta), has turned out to belong to the (sub)genus Chloris in the genus Carduelis as indicated by DNA sequences, song and eyestripe pattern; it is closely related to the greenfinches (Zamora et al., 2006). See the species account for details.

References

Zamora, Jorge; Lowy, Ernesto; Ruiz-del-Valle, Valentin; Moscoso, Juan; Serrano-Vela, Juan Ignacio; Rivero-de-Aguilar, Juan & Arnaiz-Villena, Antonio (2006): Rhodopechys obsoleta (desert finch): a pale ancestor of greenfinches (Carduelis spp.) according to molecular phylogeny. Journal of Ornithology 147(3): 448–456.(https://www.novapublishers.com/catalog/downloadOA.php?order=1&access=true&osCsid=578391717583ba2180ffa42bf304e1f6)  (HTML abstract). Erratum, Journal of Ornithology 147(3): 511–512

External links
Rhodopechys videos, photos and sounds on the Internet Bird Collection

 
Bird genera
Taxa named by Jean Cabanis